The National Prize for Exact Sciences was created in 1992 as one of the replacements for the National Prize for Sciences under Law 19169. The other two prizes in this same area are for Natural Sciences and Applied Sciences and Technologies.

It is part of the National Prize of Chile.

Jury

Winners
 1993, Servet Martínez and Eric Goles (mathematics)
 1995, Claudio Bunster (physics)
 1997, María Teresa Ruiz (astronomy)
 1999, José Maza Sancho (astronomy)
 2001,  (physics)
 2003, Carlos Conca (mathematics)
 2005,  (physics)
 2007,  (physics)
 2009, Ricardo Baeza Rodríguez (mathematics)
 2011,  (mathematics)
 2013, Manuel del Pino (mathematics)
 2015, Mario Hamuy (astronomy)
 2017, Guido Garay Brignardello (astronomy)
2019, Dora Altbir (nanoscience and nanotechnology)

See also

 CONICYT
 List of astronomy awards
 List of computer science awards
 List of mathematics awards
 List of physics awards

References

1992 establishments in Chile
Awards established in 1992
Chilean science and technology awards
Mathematics awards
Physics awards
Astronomy prizes
Computer science awards
Information science awards
1992 in Chilean law